Gold Cup may refer to:

In art and archaeology:
 Royal Gold Cup, 14th century French cup in the British Museum
 Rillaton Gold Cup, late Neolithic, from Rillaton Barrow in England
 Ringlemere Cup, Bronze Age from England

In horse racing:
 Ascot Gold Cup, horse race run at Ascot Racecourse, UK, during June
 Awapuni Gold Cup, major horse race run under weight-for-age conditions held in Awapuni, Palmerston North, New Zealand
 Ayr Gold Cup, flat horse race run at Ayr Racecourse
 Cheltenham Gold Cup, steeplechase run at Cheltenham Racecourse 
 Geraldton Gold Cup, one of Western Australia's most popular races
 Gold Cup at Greyville, Grade III stakes race over 3200m held at Greyville in Durban, South Africa
 Gold Cup at Santa Anita Stakes, Grade I stakes race currently held at Santa Anita Park
 Gold Cup Steeplechase American race
 Hawthorne Gold Cup Handicap, Grade II race for thoroughbred horses run at Hawthorne Race Course each year
 Jockey Club Gold Cup, horse race, Elmont, New York
 BetVictor Gold Cup, steeplechase run at Cheltenham Racecourse
 December Gold Cup, steeplechase run at Cheltenham Racecourse
 Tattersalls Gold Cup, horse race run at The Curragh, Ireland in May
 Virginia Gold Cup, steeplechase run on the first Saturday in May, American

In association football:
 Copa de Oro (Spanish: Gold Cup), South American association football competition between the club winners of the Copa Libertadores de América, the Supercopa Sudamericana, the Copa CONMEBOL, and the Supercopa Masters
 CONCACAF Gold Cup, association football competition between nations from North and Central America and from the Caribbean
 CONCACAF W Championship, known as the CONCACAF Women's Gold Cup from 2000 to 2006, women's association football competition
 CONCACAF W Gold Cup, women's association football competition
 Gold Cup (Northern Ireland), defunct association football competition
 Aga Khan Gold Cup, defunct association football competition

In rugby union:
 Gold Cup (rugby union), a South African rugby union competition between the winners of the club championships of provincial unions

In motorsport:
 Oulton Park International Gold Cup, an annual non-Championship Formula One race of the 1950s and '60s, recently reinstated for historic F1 cars
 APBA Gold Cup, an annual hydroplane racing cup on the Detroit River
 UAW-GM Spirit of Detroit Hydrofest, an annual hydroplane racing cup on the Detroit River, formerly known as the Gold Cup
 HAPO Gold Cup, an H1 Unlimited hydroplane boat race held each July on the Columbia River in Columbia Park, Tri-Cities, Washington
 Scarborough Gold Cup, an annual motorcycle circuit race, held at Oliver's Mount, in Scarborough, North Yorkshire

In sailing:
 Scandinavian Gold Cup, annual nation race of 5.5 metre class yachts.
 Dragon Gold Cup, established in 1937 for Dragon Class one-design yachts.
 Finn Gold Cup, annual World Championship event for Finn dinghies.
 King Edward VII Gold Cup, raced in Bermuda with International One Design class yachts.
 Nordic Folkboat Gold Cup, established in 1963 for Nordic Folkboat class one-design yachts.

In contract bridge:
 Gold Cup (bridge), the premier open competition in the United Kingdom

See also
 Cup of Gold (novel), 1929 novel by John Steinbeck
 Cup of Gold, Solandra maxima, tropical tree-climbing plant